Toužetín is a municipality and village in Louny District in the Ústí nad Labem Region of the Czech Republic. It has about 200 inhabitants.

Administrative parts
Villages of Donín and Sulec are administrative parts of Toužetín.

Notable people
František Fajtl (1912–2006), fighter pilot

References

Villages in Louny District